The Shravanabelagola inscription of Nandisena, dated to the 7th century, is one of the early poetic inscriptions in the Kannada language. The inscription extols saint Nandisena of Shravanabelagola (a prominent place of Jain religious power and worship) and his journey to heaven ("world of gods", lit, devaloka). According to the "Institute for Classical Kannada Studies", the inscription, which it dates to 700 A.D., is suffused with literary characteristics and figure of speech. It is therefore important to the study of the development of Kannada literature. According to the scholar D.R. Nagaraj, exalting the "individual as the hero of the community" is the commonality the Nandisena inscription has with the other metrical Kannada inscriptions of the period; the Halmidi inscription and the Kappe Arabhatta inscription.

Text of Inscription

Text in Modern Kannada script

English translation

Notes

References

See also

 Jainism in Karnataka
 Jainism in north Karnataka
 Jainism in Tulu Nadu

Kannada literature
Literature of Karnataka
Earliest known manuscripts by language
Jain temples in Karnataka
Kannada inscriptions
7th-century inscriptions